The 609th Information Warfare Squadron was a squadron assigned to 9th Air Force under Air Combat Command with headquarters at Shaw Air Force Base in Sumter, South Carolina. It was the first operational information warfare combat unit in United States military history. It primarily supported fighter wings in the eastern United States and in the United States Central Air Forces area of operations.

History

Lineage
 Established as 609th Information Warfare Squadron and activated on September 28, 1995.
 Inactivated on June 30, 1999

Assignments
 9th Air Force, September 28, 1995 - June 30, 1999

Stations

 Shaw AFB, South Carolina, September 28, 1995 - June 30, 1999.

References

Bibliography

 Endicott, Judy G. USAF Active Flying, Space, and Missile Squadrons as of 1 October 1995. Washington, DC: Office of Air Force History, 1999.
 Fletcher, Harry R. Air Force Bases: Volume II, Air Bases Outside the United States of America. Office of Air Force History, 1989. .

External links

 GlobalSecurity.org 609th IWS reference

Military units and formations in South Carolina
Information warfare squadrons of the United States Air Force